Cruiser Emden is a 1932 German war film directed by Louis Ralph and starring Ralph, Renée Stobrawa, Hans Schlenck, and Werner Fuetterer. It was shot at the Emelka Studios in Munich. It is a remake of a 1926 silent film Our Emden which had also been directed by Ralph. The film depicts the German First World War cruiser .

Cast
 Louis Ralph as Captain von Müller
 Renée Stobrawa as Grete
 Hans Schlenck as Adjutant
 Werner Fuetterer as Petzold
 Fritz Greiner as Mertens
 Will Dohm as Russian Captain
 Willy Kaiser-Heyl as Australian Captain
 O.E. Hasse as English Officer
 Julius Brandt as English Officer
 Georg Henrich as Direktor Schröder
 Kurd E. Heyne as Matrose der "Emden"
 Toni Forster-Larrinaga as Anuschka
 Rudolf Hoch as Captain of the 'Markomania'
 Charles Willy Kayser as Offizier der "Emden"
 Helmut Käutner as Matrose der 'Emden'
 Else Kündinger as Stenotypist
 Albert Lippert as Offizier der "Emden"
 John Mylong as Offizier der "Emden"
 Reinhold Nietschmann as Volontär Ender
 Walter Pittschau as Offizier der "Emden"
 Helmuth Renar as Offizier der "Emden"
 Julius Riedmueller as Offizier der "Emden"
 Norbert Schultze as Matrose der 'Emden'
 Bobby Todd as Matrose der 'Emden'
 Hans von Strobl as Navigation Officer

See also
How We Beat the Emden (1915)
Our Emden (1926)
The Exploits of the Emden (1928)
Die Männer der Emden (2012)

References

Bibliography
 Kelly, Andrew. Cinema and the Great War. Routledge, 1997.
 Kester, Bernadette. Film Front Weimar: Representations of the First World War in German films of the Weimar Period (1919–1933). Amsterdam University Press, 2003.

External links

1932 films
1932 war films
German war films
1930s German-language films
Films directed by Louis Ralph
World War I naval films
World War I films based on actual events
Films of the Weimar Republic
Remakes of German films
Sound film remakes of silent films
German black-and-white films
German historical films
1930s German films
Films shot at Bavaria Studios
Bavaria Film films